The Capilla de San Juan de Dios is a church in Marbella, southern Spain. It was built in the 16th century.

References

External links
 Diario Sur: ''La rehabilitación de San Juan de Dios deja al descubierto dos arcos del siglo XVI'

Roman Catholic churches in Marbella
16th-century Roman Catholic church buildings in Spain